San José de Albán is a town and municipality in the Nariño Department, Colombia. The town was established on 15 June 1573. As of 2018 it had a population of 8,197.

Veredas
The municipality contains the following veredas:

References

Municipalities of Nariño Department